Xyrichtys rajagopalani, the Rajagopalan's razorfish, is a species of marine ray-finned fish from the family Labridae, the wrasses. The fish is found in the Indian Ocean.

Etymology
The fish is named in honor of V. Rajagopalan, of the Central Marine Fisheries Research Institute in India.

References

rajagopalani
Fish described in 1987